The San Marino is a river in the Italian peninsula. It flows through San Marino (Chiesanuova and Acquaviva), then north into Italy. For some of its length it forms part of the border between the two countries. It flows into the Marecchia at Torello, part of the commune of San Leo (Province of Rimini).

Adriatic Italian coast basins
Rivers of San Marino
Rivers of the Province of Pesaro and Urbino
Rivers of the Province of Rimini
Italy–San Marino border
Rivers of Italy